Tiantian or Tian Tian may refer to:

 Pethia tiantian or P. tiantian, a species of fish
 Tian Tian (male giant panda) (添添 Tiān Tiān), a male panda on loan to the National Zoo in Washington, DC, US
 Tian Tian (female giant panda) (甜甜 Tián Tián), a female panda on loan to the Edinburgh Zoo in Edinburgh, Scotland, UK
 Tian Tian (chess player) (田甜), Chinese Women Chess Grandmaster
 Li Tiantian (李甜甜), Chinese woman's sprint canoeist
 Sun Tiantian (孙甜甜 Sūn Tiántián), (born 1981) Chinese woman tennis player
 Wang Tiantian (王湉湉 Wáng Tiántián), (born 1986) Chinese female gymnast